Below is a list organised by food group and given in measurements of grams of protein per 100 grams of food portion. The reduction of water content has the greatest effect of increasing protein as a proportion of the overall mass of the food in question. Not all protein is equally digestible. Protein Digestibility Corrected Amino Acid Score (PDCAAS) is a method of evaluating the protein quality based on the amino acid requirements of humans.

Egg and dairy

Cheese

Whole chicken egg
10.62 to 13.63 (cooked)

Milk and milk substitutes
 Cow milk (fluid, raw or pasteurized) - 3.2 to 3.3
 Soy milk 5.1 to 7.5
 Goat milk 4.9 to 9.9
 Almond milk 1

Meat and mock meat

Common red meats
 Beef, cooked - 16.9 to 40.6
 high scores: braised eye-of-round steak 40.62; broiled t-bone steak (porterhouse) 32.11
 average scores: baked lean (ground beef) 24.47
 low scores: corned beef: 16.91
 Lamb, cooked - 20.91 to 50.9

Less-common meat
 Bearded seal game meat, dried: 82.6
 Moose game meat, dried: 79.5
 Beaver game meat, broiled: 23.0
 Kangaroo: 21.4

White meat
 Fish (farmed Atlantic Salmon) 20.4 (USDA)
 Mock meat (cooked vegetarian preparations): 18.53 to 28.9
 Chicken: 27
 Pork: 26 to 31

Vegetables, grain, and pulses 

Vegetables 
 Wolffia arrhiza, dry weight: 40
 Nori seaweed, dried sheets: 5.81
 ready-to-eat green vegetables: 0.33 to 3.11
 ready-to-eat starchy tubers: 0.87 to 6.17
 high scores: home-prepared potato pancakes 6.17; French fries 3.18-4.03
 average scores: baked potato 2.5; boiled yam 1.49
 low scores: boiled sweet potato 1.6
 boiled Black Beans: 9
 boiled chia seeds: 16 

Legumes
 dry roasted soybeans: 13
 boiled lentils: 9
 boiled Green Peas: 5
 boiled Black eyed beans: 8 
 boiled chickpeas: 9 
 peanuts (raw, roasted, butter): 23.68 to 28.04

Baked products
 Wholewheat pancakes:
 Bread: 6.7 to 11.4
 Crackers: 7.43 
 pulses: 23

Other food elements 

Natural protein concentrates (often used in bodybuilding or as sports dietary supplements):
 Soy protein isolate (prepared with sodium or potassium): 80.66
 Whey protein isolate: 79
 Egg white, dried: 81.1
 Spirulina alga, dried: 57.45 (more often quoted as 55 to 77)
 Baker's yeast: 38.33
 Hemp husks 30

Bibliography
  - all data unless specified was computed from their database.

See also
Biological value

References

External links

Nutrition
Proteins as nutrients
protein